Olena Volodymyrivna Prus (born 30 April 1986) is a Ukrainian badminton player. Prus works as a coach in Badminton Kharkiv.

Achievements

BWF International Challenge/Series 
Women's singles

Women's doubles

Mixed doubles

  BWF International Challenge tournament
  BWF International Series tournament
  BWF Future Series tournament

References

External links 
 

1986 births
Living people
People from Lysychansk
Ukrainian female badminton players
Badminton coaches
Sportspeople from Luhansk Oblast
21st-century Ukrainian women